Kumudabali is a small village of Rayagada district in the state of Odisha, India. The Temple of Balunkeswar Shiva on the banks of Vamsadhara River near the village is a scenic spot.

Introduction
The village is surrounded by the nature in its three directions and the river Vamsadhara to its north. Every year, on the festival of Maha Shivaratri, people from all nook and corner of Odisha come to visit the beautiful temple of Shiva (Lord Balunkeswara).

Geography
Kumudabali is situated about 253 km from the state headquarters i.e. Bhubaneswar and 86 km from the district headquarters Rayagada. Kumudabali is situated at lat.19° 50′N and lon. 83° 27′E. The nearest villages are Ambodala, Muniguda and Dangasorada.

Demography
 census, the population of Kumudaballi is 1763 out of which male population is 877 and female population is 886.

Tourist attraction
The temple of Lord Shiva (Balunkeswara) on the river banks of Vamsadhara, is a  picnic spot and a place of tourist attraction. The place is the confluence point of river Vamsadhara with Sakatnala.

References

External links
 Official website of Rayagada district

Cities and towns in Rayagada district
Villages in Rayagada district
Hindu temples in Rayagada district